was a film director and screenwriter from Japan. Born in Tokyo, he debuted as an assistant director in Akira Kurosawa's 1961 film Yojimbo. His film Mount Hakkoda won Mainichi Film Award for Excellence Film in 1978.

Filmography

As director 

1966 : Zero Fighters: Great Air Battle
1967 : Zoku izuko e; based on the 1939 novel Izuko e by Yōjirō Ishizaka
1967 : Sodachi zakari
1968 : Judge and Jeopardy
1968 : Aniki no koibito
1969 : Futari no koibito
1969 : Dankon (The Bullet Wounded; Bullet Wound)
1970 : Akazukinchan kiotsukete (Take Care, Red Riding Hood); based on the novel by Kaoru Shōji
1971 : Saredowareraga hibi yori wakare no shi
1971 : Shiosai; film version of the Yukio Mishima novel The Sound of Waves
1972 : Hajimete no tabi
1973 : Submersion of Japan
1977 : Mount Hakkoda
1978 : Seishoku no ishibumi
1980 : Dōran
1981 : Hyōryū; based on the novel by Akira Yoshimura
1982 : Kaikyō
1983 : Shōsetsu Yoshida gakkō; based on the non-fiction political novel by Isamu Togawa

References

Bibliography

External links
 

1931 births
1984 deaths
Japanese film directors
20th-century Japanese screenwriters